Leela Bunce (born 17 December 1980) is director of ShineTime (an organization which promotes stress relieving benefits of laughter) and a regular on the chatshow and radio circuit. She is a Laughter Yoga facilitator and member of the Laughter Network. Her background is in drama, dance, counselling, meditation, teaching and clowning.

Biography

Born in Petts Wood, London, Bunce completed her A-level studies at Newstead Wood School for Girls.  She became a Laughter Yoga facilitator after suffering back problems for many years.  Bunce is now a TV and radio personality, appearing on ITV's This Morning & Loose Women, Chris Evans' Drivetime show on Radio 2, BBC1's The Science of the Young Ones, BBC2's Frank Skinner's Opinionated and comedian Rob Rouse's forthcoming TV show Rob's Odd Jobs, and acting as laughter consultant on Spine TV's Mystro Investigates and Skate Nation for CBBC.

Bunce is also a clown who has appeared in many shows in London, around the UK and in Italy. She is currently working on her first solo clown show entitled Waiting For Stanley.

References

External links
Chris Evans video
ShineTime

1980 births
Living people
People from Bromley
People educated at Newstead Wood School
English clowns